Kiran Millwood Hargrave (born 29 March 1990) is a British poet, playwright and novelist.

Life
Hargrave was born on 29 March 1990 in London. She graduated from Cambridge University in 2011, and Oxford University in 2014.

Career
She started writing for publication in 2009. In 2014, her debut novel The Girl Of Ink and Stars aka The Cartographer's Daughter was bought as part of a six-figure, two-book deal by Knopf Random House (US), and Chicken House Scholastic (rest-of-world). It was published in May 2016 in the UK, where it won the overall Waterstones Children's Book Prize 2017 and the British Book Awards' Children's Book of the Year. The US release was in November 2016. It has sold to over twenty-five territories around the world, and is a perennial bestseller in the UK.

Hargrave's poetry has appeared internationally in journals such as Magma, Room, Agenda, Shearsman, The Irish Literary Review and Orbis. In 2013, Neil Astley judged her poem 'Grace' winner of the Yeovil Literary Prize. This poem appeared in her third collection, Splitfish (Gatehouse Press, 2013). Her first piece as a playwright, about human trafficking, was entitled BOAT, and first dramatized in October 2015 by PIGDOG theatre company at Theatre N16 in Balham. It opened to five-star reviews, with CultureFly calling it "the most compelling and urgent piece of theatre you will see this year." 

Her second children's novel of a fragile paradise, The Island at the End of Everything (2017) was shortlisted for the 2017 Costa Book Awards. Her third children's novel, The Way Past Winter, was published in late 2018, followed in 2019 by her debut YA novel, The Deathless Girls. Her first adult novel, The Mercies was published by Picador in 2020, and became an instant bestseller. Julia and the Shark (2021) in collaboration with her husband, Tom de Freston, was shortlisted for Waterstones Book of the Year and the Wainwright Prize for Children's Writing on Nature and Conservation.

Personal life
She currently lives in Oxford with her husband, the visual artist Tom de Freston. She is bisexual. Hargrave is partly of Indian descent, through her mother.

Works

Adult novels
 The Mercies (Picador, 2020)
 The Dance Tree (Picador, 2022)

Young Adult novels
 The Deathless Girls (Orion, 2019)

Children's books
 The Girl of Ink and Stars (Chicken House, 2016)
 The Island at the End of Everything (Chicken House, 2017)
 The Way Past Winter (Chicken House, 2018)
 A Secret of Birds & Bone (Chicken House, 2020)
 Julia and the Shark (Orion, 2021)
 Leila and the Blue Fox (Orion, 2022)

Awards and recognitions
 2013: Yeovil International Poetry Prize, winner
 2017: Waterstones Children's Books Prize, winner (The Girl of Ink & Stars)
 2017: British Book Awards Children's Book of the Year, winner (The Girl of Ink & Stars)
 2017: Jhalak Prize, shortlist (The Girl of Ink & Stars)
 2017: Costa Book Prize, shortlist (The Island at the End of Everything)
 2018: The Blue Peter Book Award, shortlist (The Island at the End of Everything)
 2018: Jhalak Prize, shortlist (The Island at the End of Everything)
 2018: CILIP Carnegie Medal, longlist (The Island at the End of Everything)
 2018: Blackwell's Children's Book of the Year, winner (The Way Past Winter)
 2018: Specsaver's National Book Award, longlist (The Way Past Winter)
 2019: The YA Book Prize, shortlist (The Deathless Girls)
 2020: The Diverse Book Awards, shortlist (The Deathless Girls)
 2020: Prix Femina, finalist (The Mercies)
 2020: Prix Rive Gauche à Paris, winner (The Mercies)
 2021: CILIP Carnegie Medal, longlist (The Deathless Girls)
 2021: Betty Trask Award (The Mercies)
 2021: Waterstones Book of the Year, shortlist (Julia and the Shark)
 2021: Waterstones Gift of the Year, winner (Julia and the Shark)
 2022: Wainwright Prize for Children's Writing on Nature and Conservation, shortlist (Julia and the Shark)

References

External links
 

1990 births
Living people
British poets
British women poets
Bisexual poets
Bisexual novelists
Alumni of the University of Cambridge
Alumni of the University of Oxford
English LGBT novelists
English LGBT poets
English bisexual writers
Bisexual women
British writers of Indian descent